Calvin Wooding Fowler Sr. (born July 29, 1935) is an American lawyer and politician who served as a member of the Virginia House of Delegates.

In 1965, he joined the law firm of Sanford & Clement (today Clement & Wheatley), after serving as assistant commonwealth's attorney in Danville. The son of former Delegate Clinton A. Fowler, he was first elected to the House in 1969 to succeed Dan Daniel, who resigned following his election to Congress.

References

External links 
 

1935 births
Living people
Democratic Party members of the Virginia House of Delegates
20th-century American politicians